Prof. Meijinlung Kamson (born 17 January 1939 is an Indian politician from Majorkhul in District Imphal (Manipur) who has served as the Union Minister of State for Home Affairs from 1995–96. 

He was elected four times to 8th, 9th, 10th and 11th Lok Sabha from Outer Manipur (Lok Sabha constituency) in Manipur, India.

Personal life 
Born in a Naga family, Kamson has been married to P. Gaichui since 12 May 1967, and has two sons and three daughters.

References

1939 births
India MPs 1984–1989
India MPs 1989–1991
India MPs 1991–1996
India MPs 1996–1997
Manipur politicians
People from Imphal
Lok Sabha members from Manipur
Living people
Naga people